Lydia Mikhaylovna Koreneva (31 July 1885 - 2 July 1982) was a Russian, Soviet stage actress associated with the Moscow Art Theatre.

Biography
Born into a Tambov-based noble family, Koreneva moved to Moscow aged 16 and enrolled into the MAT Drama school in 1904 which she graduated from in 1907 to join the Stanislavski-led troupe. Her first roles included Ksenya in Boris Godunov (1907), Water in The Blue Bird and Marya Antonovna in Revizor (both 1908), but her breakthrough came on 9 September 1909 when Turgenev's A Month in the Country premiered, and Koreneva's performance as Verochka was lauded by, among many others, Maria Yermolova. Painter and scenic designer of A Month in the Country Mstislav Dobuzhinsky, infatuated with both the production and Koreneva, made several portraits of her, as did Konstantin Somov. Among her followers at the time were Léon Bakst and Alexander Blok.
 Next season the part of Lise in The Karamazov Brothers endorsed Koreneva as the star of the Moscow theatre and the most popular young actress in MAT. Her later successes included Anya in The Cherry Orchard (1912), Irina in Three Sisters (1922-1924, during the theatre's world tour) as well as several parts in the theatre's Dostoyevsky repertoire. In 1915-1917 Koreneva was cast in five Russian films, including Yevgeni Bauer-directed The King of Paris, as Lucienne Marechal.

Koreneva's highly charged, poetic and exalted stage persona proved to be very akin to her real life character, according to theatre historian Inna Solovyova. In 1920s she turned into easily 'the most capricious actress in the history of MAT', as the critic Vadim Shverubovich remembered. Mikhail Bulgakov portrayed her sarcastically as the hysterical Lyudmila Silvestrovna Pryakhina in his Theatrical Novel, although several critics warned against taking this caricature at face value. Despite behind close curtain conflicts and scandals, Koreneva's work on stage remained inspired and consistent. In 1938 she was honoured with the People’s Artist of the RSFSR title.

In 1930s Koreneva became very close to the Stanislavski family. In 1941, as the MAT troupe was evacuated from Moscow, she was the only one who stayed behind, so as to provide care to Stanislavski's widow Maria Lilina who was dying of cancer. Koreneva's last major success on stage was Anna Zvezdintseva in Lev Tolstoy's The Fruits of Enlightenment in 1951. A year later it earned her the Stalin Prize of the first order. In 1958 Koreneva was forced to retire. Scandalized, she swore never to set foot in this theatre and held her promise. She died in Moscow on 2 July 1982, aged 96, and is interred in Vagankovo Cemetery.

References

External links
 

Russian stage actresses
Russian silent film actresses
Moscow Art Theatre
People from Tambov
1885 births
1982 deaths
Burials at Vagankovo Cemetery